Denticetopsis epa is a species of whale catfish endemic to Brazil where it is known from several localities in the lower portions of the Tocantins River basin.  This species grows to a length of 4.7 cm (1.9 inches).

References 
 

Cetopsidae
Catfish of South America
Endemic fauna of Brazil
Fish of the Tocantins River basin
Fish described in 2005